The first elections to the Arunachal Pradesh Legislative Assembly were held in on 25 February 1978.

There were 30 single-member constituencies at the time of the election, out of whom two were reserved for Scheduled Tribes. There was a total of 86 candidates participating. The maximum number of candidates was found in the Ziro constituency, with six candidates. In two constituencies (Prem Khandu Thungan from Dirang, Kalaktang and  Noksong Boham from Niasua-Kanubari) there was only one candidate, who was elected unopposed. There were 29 Janata Party candidates, 21 People's Party of Arunachal candidates, 1 Indian National Congress candidate (Shri Tasso Grayu) and 35 independents in the fray. The speaker of the Legislative Assembly, Nonemati, contested as a Janata Party candidate from Khonsa North constituency. A total of 105 nominations had been presented, out of which 3 had been rejected by the Election Commission (a PPA candidate from Yingdiono-Pangin constituency, an independent from Ziro and an independent from Along North).

A peculiar situation for the tribal societies of the Union Territory was the fact that in many constituencies members of the same families (even brothers) or clans fought against each other for different parties. 
There were only two female candidates (Nyari Welly and Omem Deori) standing in the election. Neither was elected.

Janata Party won 17 seats, compared to 8 seats for the PPA. 5 seats were won by independents. Following the election a five-member cabinet was sworn in on 14 March 1978, headed by Janata Party leader Prem Khandu Thungan as Chief Minister. Other ministers were Gegong Apang, Tadar Tang, Soben Tayang and Nokme. The newly elected assembly held its first session in Itanagar on 21 March 1978. Three members were nominated by the Governor to sit in the Assembly, amongst them was one woman (Sibo Kai).

Results

Elected Members

References

 State Assembly elections in Arunachal Pradesh
1970s in Arunachal Pradesh
Arunachal